Coleophora annulicola is a moth of the family Coleophoridae. It is found in the United States, including Montana and Utah.

The larvae feed on the leaves of Aster and Solidago species. They create an annulate case.

References

annulicola
Moths described in 1925
Moths of North America